The BANDUNG 2017 Specialized World Stamp Exhibition was an international stamp exhibition held 3–7 August 2017 at the Trans Studio Convention Center in Bandung, Indonesia. The exhibition was granted patronage from the Fédération Internationale de Philatélie (FIP).

There were 455 exhibits.

Palmares
The Grand Prix awards went to the following exhibits:

The Grand Prix International went to Ding Jinsong (China) for ‘The 1897 Red Revenue Surcharges of China‘ (97 points).

The Grand Prix National went to Indra Kusuma (Indonesia) for ‘Repoeblik Indonesia 1945–1949, Local Issued Stamps during Independent War in Java Island‘ (96 points).

References

External links 
 Palmares List

2017
August 2017 events in Indonesia
Entertainment events in Indonesia